Paralyzer (Randall Darby), also known as the second Shocker, is a fictional character, a mutant appearing in American comic books published by Marvel Comics.

Publication history
Shocker II, created by Jack Kirby, first appeared in Captain America Annual #4 (1977).

The character subsequently appears in The Defenders #78-80 (Dec. 1979-Feb. 1980), 83 (May 1980), 87 (Sept. 1980), 125-126 (Nov.-Dec. 1983), and 128-130 (Feb.-April 1984). The character appears as Paralyzer in Captain America #343 (July 1988), 346 (Oct. 1988), 368 (March 1990), 394 (Nov. 1991), Midnight Sons Unlimited #3 (Oct. 1993), and Captain America #426 (April 1994). The character returns to his Shocker identity, appearing in The New Warriors vol. 2 #6 (March 2000), X-Men #132 (Nov. 2002), The Uncanny X-Men #442-443 (June 2004), Excalibur vol. 3 #2 (Aug. 2004), and The New Avengers #16-19 (April-July 2006).

Shocker II appeared as part of the "Mutant Force" entry in the Official Handbook of the Marvel Universe Deluxe Edition #9.

Fictional character biography
Randall Darby was discovered and recruited by Magneto to become a member of his Brotherhood of Evil Mutants, taking the code-name Shocker. After being abandoned by Magneto, Darby and his teammates came to be known as the Mutant Force. Under this name they work for the United States government, and, later, the Secret Empire.

Darby changes his code-name to Paralyzer when the Mutant Force become the Resistants. The Resistants' protest against the United States' Mutant Registration Act was cut short by a clash with John Walker, who was the current Captain America. Later, the Resistants revert to their Mutant Force identities and costumes. Their next clash is with the New Warriors.

Paralyzer later battles Spider-Man, subduing him with a lucky blow. Spider-Man later teams up with several members of the Midnight Sons who were investigating the activities of a more demonic Spidey-doppelganger. While pursuing this creature, the heroes discover and stop Paralyzer's plan to recreate Zzzax.

After the Sentinels destroy Genosha, Paralyzer, again called the Shocker, helps Toad and other mutants create a statue of Genosha's former ruler Magneto. Unus becomes the leader of the group. 

Shocker is seen during a meeting of Unus' people, after Unus himself was swallowed by Freakshow, one of the other mutants on the island. Their group was not sure if they would take Unus back if, in fact, he had survived. He does return, prompting Shocker and the others into attacking him in order to prove he could still defend himself.

Shocker loses his powers on M-Day and the energies that he used to control were then drawn to The Collective.

Powers and abilities
Darby can generate powerful fields of bio-electromagnetic energy from his body. He also has cybernetic claws of unknown origin in lieu of his hands and feet, and can channel his electrical energy through them into shock bolts or high-voltage fields of electromagnetic energy.

Other versions

Civil War: House of M
Randall Darby is among the mutants in Magneto's army. He is punished for wanting to kill an injured enemy. Later, Shocker is killed during the liberation of Genosha, an island that has mutant slaves.

References

External links
 

Comics characters introduced in 1977
Characters created by Jack Kirby
Fictional activists
Fictional mercenaries in comics
Marvel Comics mutants
Marvel Comics supervillains